Lamar is the home rule municipality that is the county seat and the most populous municipality of Prowers County, Colorado. The city population was 7,804 at the 2010 United States Census.  The city was named after L.Q.C. Lamar, a slaveholder, Confederate soldier and diplomat who wrote the Mississippi Secession Ordinance, and after the Civil War, went on to serve as Secretary of the Interior and as a Supreme Court Justice.

History
Lamar was founded on May 24, 1886, by Issac Holmes.  It was named after Lucius Lamar. At the time Lamar was the Secretary of the Interior, but previously he had written the Mississippi Ordinance of Secession, served the Confederacy as an officer and a diplomat. The first town elections were held in December, and C. M. Morrison became the town's first mayor. In 1889 Prowers County was established, and Lamar was elected to house the county's government. Throughout its history, Lamar has suffered from fires and floods. The town was also greatly affected by the Dust Bowl, and as such participated in projects led by the Civil Works Administration, Federal Emergency Relief Administration, and the Works Progress Administration.

The northern site of the Pierre Auger Observatory of ultra-high energy cosmic rays is planned to be built near Lamar.

Geography and climate
The city lies in southeastern Colorado in northwestern Prowers County on the south side of the Arkansas River floodplain. Las Animas is about twenty miles to the west.

Transportation

Lamar receives intercity passenger rail service at the Lamar Amtrak Station via Amtrak's Southwest Chief, which runs between Chicago and Los Angeles. There is also intercity bus service provided by Bustang. Lamar is the last eastbound stop of the Lamar-Pueblo-Colorado Springs Outrider line.

Highways
 US 50 is an east-west highway running from California to Maryland.  It is also the main route to Pueblo and Las Animas.
 Prowers County Road 196 (state has abandoned the highway) is an  stretch that connects around Lamar to Wiley.
  US 287/385 are two concurrent highways that run south through Lamar.  They connect Lamar to Springfield.  US 287 runs from Texas State Highway 87 in Port Arthur, Texas, to US 89 at Choteau, Montana.  US 385 runs from Big Bend National Park in Texas to US 85 in Deadwood, South Dakota.

Climate

According to the Köppen climate classification, Lamar is located in a cold semi-arid climate (Bsk)

Demographics

As of the census of 2010, there were 7,804 people, 3,102 households, and 1,980 families living in the city. The racial makeup of the city was 78.6% White, 0.7% African American, 1.0% Native American, 0.4% Asian, 0.0% Pacific Islander, 16.3% from other races, and 3.0% from two or more races. Hispanic or Latino of any race were 39.7% of the population.

There were 3,102 households, out of which 42.2% were married couples living together, 15.8% had a female householder with no husband present, and 36.2% were non-families. 31.8% of all households were made up of individuals living alone, and 12.8% had someone living alone who was 65 years of age or older. The average household size was 2.43 and the average family size was 3.07.

In the city, the population was spread out, with 27.8% under the age of 18, 10.4% from 18 to 24, 23.4% from 25 to 44, 24.3% from 45 to 64, and 14.1% who were 65 years of age or older. The median age was 34.1 years. For every 100 females, there were 93.7 males. For every 100 females age 18 and over, there were 88.8 males.

The median income for a household in the city was $31,521, and the median income for a family was $43,588. Males working full-time and year-round had a median income of $31,621 versus $30,148 for females. The per capita income for the city was $16,944. About 21.4% of families and 24.6% of the population were below the poverty line, including 34.1% of those under age 18 and 15.1% of those age 65 or over.

Education
Lamar is part of School District RE-2, and it is home to Lamar Community College.

Economy
Lamar was originally founded as a town with an agriculture-based economy. In 1982 the German bus manufacturer Neoplan opened a manufacturing plant employing 650, but it closed down in 2006. Lamar has increasingly relied on tourism.

Notable people
Notable individuals who were born in or have lived in Lamar include:
 Gordon L. Allott (1907-1989), U.S. Senator from Colorado
 Marvin Ash (1914-1974), jazz pianist
 Ken Curtis (1916-1991), actor, singer
 Scott Elarton (1976- ), baseball pitcher
 Curt Gentry (1931-2014), journalist, non-fiction author
 Gerald Gregg (1907-1985), illustrator, book cover artist
 Wayne R. Grisham (1923-2011), U.S. Representative from California
 Floyd D. Hall (1916-2012), pilot, airline executive
 Sharon Herbaugh (1954 - 1993), war correspondent for the Associated Press
 Wesley Tuttle (1917-2003), singer-songwriter, guitarist
 Sandy Vance (1947- ), baseball pitcher

See also
Madonna of the Trail monument
National Old Trails Road
Santa Fe National Historic Trail
The Lamar Ledger

References

Further reading
 The National Old Trails Road To Southern California, Part 1 (LA to KC); Automobile Club Of Southern California; 64 pages; 1916. (Download 6.8MB PDF eBook)
 Thomas Lamar Coughlin "Those Southern Lamars"

External links
 City of Lamar
 Lamar City Map, CDOT
 Lamar School District RE-2

Cities in Prowers County, Colorado
Cities in Colorado
County seats in Colorado
Colorado populated places on the Arkansas River
Populated places established in 1886
1886 establishments in Colorado